Nikki van Dijk (born 28 November 1994) is an Australian professional surfer. She has been a touring competitor in the World Surf League, the top flight of international professional surfing.

Personal life
Van Dijk has an older sister, Nina, and a younger brother, Joe. She attended Newhaven College, located in Phillip Island. Her mother (Karen Van Dijk) is a teacher at Cowes Primary School, the public school located on Phillip Island.

Career
Van Dijk won the women's world junior title in 2012 in Bali. In 2013, she competed in the Association of Surfing Professionals' Qualifying Series; she ended her season by winning the Pantin Classic Galicia Pro in Spain, and qualified for the ASP Women's Championship Tour. As a rookie, van Dijk finished 13th on the 2014 Women's Samsung Galaxy Championship Tour.

Van Dijk continued to compete at the highest level of the sport through 2021 with the World Surf League, the successor to the ASP tour. In May 2015 she got her best result in a WSL CT competition in Fiji, moving into quarters. In 2021 she finished 13th on the WSL tour, below the automatic qualifying threshold for the 2022 season.

At the same time she was on tour, she competed in some Qualifying Series events. In June 2015 she won Los Cabos Open of Surfing at Zippers beach.

2015 was van Dijk's best year on the WSL tour, finishing the year with six quarter-finals in a row. She finished in 9th place for the season, and qualified to compete on the WSL tour again in 2016.

Career Highlights

Sponsors 
Van Dijk's sponsors have included Rip Curl, Channel Islands Surfboards, Oakley and Kommunity Project.

References

External links

1994 births
Living people
Sportswomen from Victoria (Australia)
Australian female surfers
World Surf League surfers